Luther Seminary is a seminary of the Evangelical Lutheran Church in America (ELCA) in Saint Paul, Minnesota. It is the largest seminary of the ELCA. It also accepts and educates students of 41 other denominations and traditions. It is accredited by the Higher Learning Commission and the Association of Theological Schools. It also has theological accreditation through the ELCA as well as the United Methodist Church.

History
Luther Seminary is the result of a series of mergers that consolidated what at one time were five separate institutions into one seminary.

Luther Theological Seminary
In 1917, three Norwegian-American Lutheran churches united to create the Norwegian Lutheran Church of America (NLCA). Each of the three church bodies had operated a seminary. The Norwegian Synod's Luther Seminary in Saint Paul, Minnesota, had been founded in 1876; the Hauge Synod's Red Wing Seminary in Red Wing, Minnesota, in 1879; and the United Norwegian Lutheran Church's United Church Seminary in Saint Paul, in 1892. The merged seminaries occupied the site of the United Church Seminary because it was the most developed and elaborate, and retained the name of the oldest of the three schools, namely, Luther Theological Seminary.

The NLCA took the name Evangelical Lutheran Church in 1946 and, with other churches, formed the American Lutheran Church (ALC) in 1960.

The presidents of Luther Theological Seminary:
 Marcus Olaus Bockman (1892–1917) (United Church)
 Marcus Olaus Bockman (1917–1930)
 T. F. Gullixson (1930–1954)
 Alvin Rogness (1954–1974)
 Lloyd Svendsbye (1974–1982)

Augsburg Theological Seminary
Augsburg Theological Seminary, later renamed Augsburg University, was founded in 1869 at Marshall, Wisconsin, later moved to Minneapolis, Minnesota, and in 1897 became the seminary of the Lutheran Free Church. It remained a separate seminary until 1963, at which time the Lutheran Free Church merged with the American Lutheran Church and Augsburg Seminary was merged with Luther Theological Seminary. The merged institution took the Luther Theological Seminary name and the 1869 founding date of Augsburg Seminary.

Northwestern Lutheran Theological Seminary
Northwestern Lutheran Theological Seminary traces its origin to the Chicago Lutheran Divinity School, begun in Chicago, Illinois, in 1920 following action taken by the English Evangelical Lutheran Synod of the Northwest, a synod of the United Lutheran Church in America. In 1921, the seminary was moved to Fargo, North Dakota, and the following year to Minneapolis. From 1921 to 1982, its name was Northwestern Lutheran Theological Seminary. Located in north Minneapolis from 1922 to 1940 and in south Minneapolis from 1940 to 1967, it moved near the campus of Luther Theological Seminary in Saint Paul in 1967. At the time of the formation of the Lutheran Church in America (LCA) in 1962, Northwestern Lutheran Theological Seminary was placed under the jurisdiction of two supporting synods: the Minnesota Synod and the Red River Valley Synod.

The presidents of Northwestern Lutheran Theological Seminary:

 Joseph Stump (1920–1935)
 Paul Roth (1935–1950)
 Jonas Dressler (1950–1957)
 Clemens Zeidler (1957–1976)
 Lloyd Svendsbye (1976–1982)

Luther Northwestern Theological Seminary
Desiring to make witness to a shared mission in theological education, Luther and Northwestern seminaries were functionally unified in 1976, beginning with a single administration. After a period of six years, the two seminaries formally merged on July 1, 1982, as Luther Northwestern Theological Seminary.

On January 1, 1988, Luther Northwestern Theological Seminary became affiliated with the Evangelical Lutheran Church in America, which was formed by a merger of the LCA, the ALC, and the Association of Evangelical Lutheran Churches. The seminary's name was simplified to Luther Seminary on July 1, 1994.

The presidents of Luther Seminary (1982–1994 as Luther Northwestern Theological Seminary):

 Lloyd Svendsbye (1982–1987)
 Gib Fjellman (1987) (interim)
 David L. Tiede (1988–2005) 
 Richard Bliese (2005–2012)
 Rick Foss (2012–2014) (interim)
 Robin Steinke (2014–present)

Academics
In the 2018–2019 academic year, Luther Seminary served 490 total students, employing 28 faculty. Luther offers a Master of Divinity degree (M.Div.) for students seeking ordination, as well as Master of Arts, Master of Theology, Doctor of Ministry (D.Min.), and Doctor of Philosophy (Ph.D.) degrees for other students. In the fall of 2013, Luther Seminary suspended new admissions to the Ph.D program for at least three years as part of budget cuts. The seminary was planning to again offer the Ph.D. program, with classing beginning in the fall semester of 2018.

As in most seminaries, M.Div. students complete three years of theological education, divided into a junior year (first), middler year (second) and senior year (final). A full year of internship, usually in a parish, is an integral part of pastoral training, and a degree requirement for ELCA M.Div. students. While individual situations may vary, internship typically begins after two-thirds of coursework has been completed. Thus, most students complete internship between their middler and senior year. The internship requirement is unique to the ELCA among the other mainline denominations in the U.S.

Frederick Buechner
Luther Seminary has affiliations with the acclaimed American theologian and author, Frederick Buechner. In addition to being a key part of the curriculum, the works of Buechner have regularly been distributed by the seminary among its students. In 2014, Luther Seminary also instituted the Frederick Buechner Prize for Excellence in Preaching.

Notable faculty
 Marcus Olaus Bøckmann
 Carl Braaten
 Gerhard Forde
 Richard A. Jensen
 John N. Kildahl
 John O. Evjen
 Hans Gerhard Stub
 Jacob Tanner
 Terence E. Fretheim

Notable alumni
 Johan Arnd Aasgaard
 Lowell G. Almen
 Stuart E. Barstad
 Paul Egertson
 Mark Hanson
 Robert Jenson
 John N. Kildahl
 M. Victor Paul
 J. A. O. Preus II
 Fredrik A. Schiotz
 V. Trygve Jordahl

See also
 Norway Lutheran Church

References

External links
 

Educational institutions established in 1869
Seminaries and theological colleges in Minnesota
National Register of Historic Places in Saint Paul, Minnesota
Universities and colleges in Saint Paul, Minnesota
Lutheran seminaries
University and college buildings on the National Register of Historic Places in Minnesota
1869 establishments in Minnesota